This is a list of Barbadian artists, either from Barbados or associated with Barbados, including sculptors, ceramists, painters, photographers and designers.

A
 Ras Akyem

B
 Karl Broodhagen (1909–2002)
 Edward Rupert Burrowes (1903–1966)

C

 Alison Chapman-Andrews (born 1942)
 Jeena Chatrani

D
 Paul Dash (born 1946)
 Annalee Davis (born 1963)

G
 Stanley Greaves (born 1934)

J
 William Johnston (painter) (1732–1772)

K
 Gwendolyn Knight (1913–2005)

P
 Coral Bernadine Pollard (born c. 1940)

R
 Rihanna (born 1988)
 Sheena Rose (born 1985)

S
 Kara Springer

See also
List of Barbadians

Barbadian
Barbadian artists
artists